The EAR 60 class, also known as the Governor class, was a class of  gauge  Garratt-type articulated steam locomotives built for the East African Railways as a development of the EAR's existing 56 class.

History
The 29 members of the 60 class were ordered by the EAR from Beyer, Peacock & Co.  The first 12 of them were built by sub-contractors Société Franco-Belge in Raismes (Valenciennes), France, and the rest were built by Beyer, Peacock in Gorton, Manchester, England.  The class entered service in 1953-54.

Initially, all members of the class carried the name of a Governor (or equivalent) of Kenya, Tanganyika or Uganda, but later all of the Governor nameplates were removed.

Class list
The builder's and fleet numbers, and initial names, of each member of the class were as follows:

See also
List of colonial governors of Kenya
List of Governors of Tanganyika
List of Governors of Uganda
Rail transport in Kenya
Rail transport in Uganda

References

Notes

Bibliography

External links

Beyer, Peacock locomotives
East African Railways locomotives
Garratt locomotives
Metre gauge steam locomotives
Railway locomotives introduced in 1949
Steam locomotives of Kenya
Steam locomotives of Uganda
4-8-2+2-8-4 locomotives